Rhopalocarpus macrorhamnifolius is a tree in the family Sphaerosepalaceae. It is endemic to Madagascar.

Distribution and habitat
Rhopalocarpus macrorhamnifolius is known from populations along the east coast of Madagascar, specifically in the regions of Sava, Alaotra Mangoro, Analanjirofo, Atsinanana and Anosy. Its habitat is humid to evergreen forests from sea-level to  altitude. Some populations are within protected areas.

Threats
Rhopalocarpus macrorhamnifolius is threatened by shifting patterns of agriculture. Because the species is used as timber and in the production of paper, subsistence harvesting is also a threat.

References

macrorhamnifolius
Endemic flora of Madagascar
Trees of Madagascar
Plants described in 1962
Taxa named by René Paul Raymond Capuron